Starvegoat Island (or Starve Goat Island) was a small island in the Providence River, Providence, Rhode Island. The island also appears as "Sunshine Island" on the 1927 North American datum map produced by the US Army Corps of Engineers 30th Battalion. The island was the southeasternmost point in the city of Providence. During the 19th and early 20th centuries, it was known for its oystering. It was located off the coast of Fields Point until the passage between them was filled in 
during the 1950s and 1960s when the area was used as a land fill. The approximate location of the island is now an educational center for Save the Bay, and one of its features is the re-creation of a natural coastal buffer zone.

References

George L. Seavey, Rhode Island's Coastal Natural Areas.

Islands of Rhode Island
Islands of Narragansett Bay
Geography of Providence, Rhode Island
Landforms of Providence County, Rhode Island